The Ford Visos is a concept car first shown by Ford in 2003 at the Frankfurt Motor Show. It is a two-door, four-seater hatchback/fastback coupe with a side window line and vent details inspired by the old Ford Capri model.

References 

Visos
Cars introduced in 2003
Sports cars
Hatchbacks
Coupés